The Bank of Baroda Tanzania Limited (BBTL), also known as the Bank of Baroda Tanzania, is a commercial bank in Tanzania. It is one of the commercial banks licensed by the Bank of Tanzania, the national banking regulator.

Overview
BBTL is involved in all aspects of commercial banking, including serving large corporations, small and medium enterprises, and individuals. BBTL is a subsidiary of the Bank of Baroda (BoB), an international bank with headquarters in Mumbai, India. As of 31 December 2017, BBTL had assets valued at TSh 170 billion (approx. US$76 million). As of 31 December 2016, the shareholder's capital was TSh 35.33 billion (approx. US$16 million).

History
BoB opened its first branch in Tanganyika in 1956. By 1967, the bank had three branches, one each of the cities of Dar es Salaam, Mwanza and Moshi. In February 1967, the bank was nationalized.

In October 2004 BBTL was re-established as a subsidiary of BoB, with a single branch in Dar es Salaam. Three years later, in August 2007, a second branch was established in Arusha, with the third branch following in Dar es Salaam in June 2013 and the fourth branch in Mwanza in July 2014.

Branch network
, BBTL had a branch network at the following locations:

(a) Head Office: 149/32 Ohio Road at Sokoine Drive, Dar es Salaam (b) Kariakoo Market Branch: Kariakoo Market, 8/13 Mafia Street, Dar es Salaam (c) Arusha Branch: 12E Goliondoi Street, Arusha and (d) Mwanza Branch: 153T Kenyatta Street, Mwanza

See also

 List of banks in Tanzania
 Economy of Tanzania
 Bank of Baroda Uganda Limited

References

External links
 Official website
 Bank of Baroda India Website

Banks of Tanzania
Companies of Tanzania
Bank of Baroda
Dar es Salaam
Banks established in 1956
1956 establishments in Tanganyika